Tytherington is a village in South Gloucestershire, England, situated  south east of Thornbury. The parish population taken at the 2011 census was 666.

To the west of the village is Tytherington Quarry, a  limestone quarry incorporating 2 active workings, operated by Hanson plc, and a disused working now designated as a Site of Special Scientific Interest.

The former Yate to Thornbury railway branch line passes through the south of the village, with two bridges in the village and a tank engine near the quarry entrance as reminders of the railway. The line now ends at the quarry and is used for the transport of stone, but used to continue through a tunnel under the A38, to Thornbury. Tytherington had its own small station on the single track line: it opened in 1872 and closed to passengers in 1944. The M5 motorway runs along the north west fringe of the village.

In the village there is a park, a former primary school (now used as the village hall), the Swan public house, a community shop, a church and a Baptist chapel. The community shop has a Post Office branch which has now reopened after being under threat of closure.

To the north-east of the village stands Tytherington Hill, with views east to the Cotswold Edge, and to the north are Cutts Heath and Milbury Heath. 
To the south of Tytherington is the hamlet of Itchington which includes an old lime works, which is now at the centre of a small development of 18 new homes.

Sport and leisure
Tytherington has a Non-League football club Tytherington Rocks F.C. who play at Hardwicke Playing Field.

References

External links

 Tytherington Parish Council website

Villages in South Gloucestershire District
Civil parishes in Gloucestershire